Leporillus is a genus of rodent in the family Muridae endemic to Australia.
It contains the following species:
 Lesser stick-nest rat (Leporillus apicalis) (extinct)
 Greater stick-nest rat (Leporillus conditor)

References

 
Rodent genera
Mammal genera with one living species
Taxa named by Oldfield Thomas
Taxonomy articles created by Polbot